Zero sound is the name given by Lev Landau in 1957 to the unique quantum vibrations in quantum Fermi liquids. The zero sound can no longer be thought of as a simple wave of compression and rarefaction, but rather a fluctuation in space and time of the quasiparticles' momentum distribution function. As the shape of Fermi distribution function changes slightly (or largely), zero sound propagates in the direction for the head of Fermi surface with no change of the density of the liquid. Predictions and subsequent experimental observations of zero sound was one of the key confirmation on the correctness of Landau's Fermi liquid theory.

Derivation from Boltzmann transport equation 
The Boltzmann transport equation for general systems in the semiclassical limit gives, for a Fermi liquid,
,

To first order in fluctuation from equilibrium, the equation becomes 
.

When the quasiparticle's mean free path  (equivalently, relaxation time ), ordinary sound waves ("first sound") propagate with little absorption. But at low temperatures  (where  and  scale as  ), the mean free path exceeds , and as a result the collision functional . Zero sound occurs in this collisionless limit.

In the Fermi liquid theory, the energy of a quasiparticle of momentum  is
,
where   is the appropriately normalized Landau parameter, and
.
The approximated transport equation then has plane wave solutions 
,
with 
given by 
.
This functional operator equation gives the dispersion relation for the zero sound waves with frequency  and wave vector  .

.

References

 

Statistical mechanics
Condensed matter physics
Lev Landau